Travers is an English and Irish surname. Notable people with the surname include:

 Allan Travers (1892–1968), Major League Baseball pitcher
 Ben Travers (1886–1980), English writer
 Bill Travers (1922–1994), English actor, screenwriter, director and animal rights activist
 Bill Travers (baseball) (born 1952), former Major League Baseball pitcher
 Dan Travers (born 1956), Scottish badminton player
 David Travers, South Australian corporate advisor and former senior public servant
 Dow Travers (born 1987), Caymanian athlete
 Emily Travers, New Zealand cricketer
 Francis Travers, English cricketer
 George Travers (1888–1946), English footballer and FA Cup winner with Barnsley F.C.
 George Travers (rugby player) (1877–1945), Welsh international rugby union player
 Henry Travers (1874–1965), English actor
 James Travers (1820–1884), Anglo-Irish recipient of the Victorian Cross
 Jerome Travers (1887–1951), American amateur golfer
 Joe Travers (1871–1942), Australian cricketer
 John Travers (actor) (born 1989), Irish actor
 John Travers (composer) (1703–1758), English composer
 John Raymond Travers (born 1967), Australian convicted of the 1986 murder of Anita Cobby
 Lily Travers, British actress and model
 Linden Travers (1913–2001), British actress
 Mark Travers (born 1999), Irish footballer
 Mary Rose-Anna Travers (1894–1941), Québécoise singer known as Madame Bolduc or La Bolduc
 Mary Travers (journalist) (born 1958), American television journalist
 Mary Travers (1936–2009), American singer; member of the folk music trio Peter, Paul and Mary
 Morris Travers (1872–1961), English chemist
 P. L. Travers (1899–1996), Australian author best known for Mary Poppins
 Paddy Travers (1883–1962), Scottish footballer and manager
 Pat Travers (born 1954), Canadian rock guitarist and singer
 Peter Travers, American film critic
 Sarah Travers (born 1974), Northern Irish journalist
 Susan Travers (1909–2003), English soldier and adventurer who served with the French Foreign Legion
 Thomas Otho Travers (1785–1844), Irish soldier, friend and aide-de-camp to Sir Stamford Rafffles
 Walter Travers (1548?–1635), English Puritan theologian
 William Travers (New Zealand politician) (1819–1903), New Zealand lawyer, politician, explorer, and naturalist
 William R. Travers (1819–1887), American lawyer and investor

Fictional characters include:

 Angela Travers, in P. G. Wodehouse's Jeeves stories
 Boyd Travers, protagonist in the computer game Medal of Honor: Airborne
 Cody Travers, lead character in the Final Fight video games
 Dahlia Travers, known as Aunt Dahlia in P. G. Wodehouse's Jeeves stories
 Kyle Travers, Cody's brother and protagonist in the video game Final Fight: Streetwise
 Quentin Travers, a member of the Watchers' Council in the Buffy The Vampire Slayer TV series
 Torquil Travers, a member of the Pure-blood Travers family from J. K. Rowling's Harry Potter series.
 Richard Travers, a character played by Rex Linn in the 1993 film Cliffhanger

References 

Norman-language surnames
English-language surnames